Patricia Díaz Perea is a Spanish professional triathlete.

She was declared "Best Individual Sports Woman 2009" by the Consejo Superior de Deportes, she is one of Spain's High Performance Athletes (DAN: Deportistas de Alto Nivel), and is a member of the Spanish National Team.

In Spain, Díaz represents the Lanzarote based triathlon club Triatlón Titanes. She studies Sports Sciences at the Universidad de Las Palmas de Gran Canaria.

ITU competitions 
In the five years from 2006 to 2010, Díaz took part in 15 International Triathlon Union (ITU) competitions and achieved 6 top ten positions.

The following list is based upon the official ITU rankings and the ITU Athletes's Profile Page.
Unless indicated otherwise, the following events are Olympic Distance Triathlons) and belong to the Elite category.

BG = the sponsor British Gas · DNF = did not finish · DNS = did not start

External links 
 Canaries Triathlon Federation
 Spanish Triathlon Federation

Notes 

Spanish female triathletes
University of Las Palmas de Gran Canaria alumni
Year of birth missing (living people)
Living people
21st-century Spanish women